After the de facto merger on 1 November 1954 and before the legal integration with the Indian Union on 16 August 1962, general elections were held in 1955 and 1959. In January 1955, The Indian union government renamed the French settlements in India as State of Pondicherry by passing an order. The previous assembly that was elected during French rule was dissolved on 13 June 1955 and the first general elections to the Pondicherry Representative Assembly were held in next month from 18 to 23 July for 39 constituencies. The election were held on the basis of adult franchise under the State of Pondicherry (Representation of the People  French: Représentation du peuple) Order, 1955 which prescribed the rules and regulations for the conduct of elections, more or less on the pattern adopted in the Indian Union.

Important Members
 President:
R.L. Purushothama Reddiar from 17 August 1955 to 23 April 1956
 Kamichetty Sri Parassourama Varaprassada Rao Naidu from 23 April 1956 to 24 October 1958
 Vice-President:
 Kamichetty Sri Parassourama Varaprassada Rao Naidu from 1954 to April 1956
 Leader of the House:
 Maurice Pakkiriswamy Pillai from  17 August 1955 to 13 January 1956
 Édouard Goubert from  20 April 1956 to 24 October 1958
 Leader of opposition:
 V. Subbiah from  17 August 1955 to 24 October 1958

Members of the First Pondicherry Representative Assembly as of 1956

Keys:

 After the Death of Pakkiriswamy Pillai, his seat fell vacant in Karaikkal in 1956. Later a by election was conducted and P. Shanmugam got elected as the sixth councillor from Karaikkal. Shanmugam was an erstwhile People's Front member from Nedungadu constituency.

Council of ministers of Goubert(1956-1958)
After death of Pakkirisamy a Council of ministers was formed under leadership of Edouard Goubert. Lt Governor during that time was Kewal Singh. The speaker of assembly was initially A. S. Gangeyan and was replaced by Kamichetty Parasuram.

Later Shanmugam related Barathan in the council of ministers (also referred as advisory council to the commissioner) and the composition was as follows:

Important proceedings 
 On 12 August 1955, the assembly passed a resolution demanding immediate de jure transfer of the state from France to Indian Union. This resolution was passed with huge majority. However, because of the Algerian war, the de jure transfer did not take place until August 1962.
 On 26 August 1955, the assembly demanded that the State of Pondicherry be kept a separate state within the Indian Union. The demand was accepted later and Puducherry is a union territory comprising the French settlements of Puducherry, Karaikkal, Mahe and Yanam.

Instability
Untimely death of the chief councillor Pakkirisamy Pillai in January 1956 started a saga of infighting among the members of Congress Party.

1956 crisis
First instance of serious infighting arouse during April 1956 which continued for four months and ended after election of Kamisetty Parasuram as the new speaker of the assembly. Congress assembly legislative party was divided about the successor of Pakkirisamy Pillai as chief councillor (a post equivalent of chief minister in Indian state assemblies). The major faction was headed Goubert and the minor faction was led by Purushothama Reddiar who had four members supporting his cause.

Election of Goubert as Chief councillor
On 20 April 1956 Goubert was elected unanimously when the Puroshathama Reddiar's faction abstained from that meeting. This issue became a scandal that attracted the attention of then Indian prime minister Nehru and Madras chief minister Kamaraj. Nehru has mentioned about it in his works. After Late Pakkirisamy's seat from Karaikal was vacant, the strength of Goubert's group got reduced from 18 to 19. The Congress party position in the Assembly was as follows: Congress-18, People's Front-15, Congress dissidents led by Reddiar's faction-5. Thus, without support of Reddiar's faction the Goubert's government could not survive as it falls below the halfway mark of 20 in a house of 39.

Removal of Purushothama Reddiar as Speaker 
On 23 April Purushothama Reddiar resigned from Congress party. He along with four other dissidents joined the opposition. After he left the assembly by declaring sine die along with his dissidents, the deputy speaker Kamichetty Parasuram was asked to act as speaker and Purushothama Reddiar got removed from speaker post unanimously in an unceremonious way.

The speaker election was necessitated as Puroshottama Reddiar was about to retire as speaker as he along with four dissidents joined the opposition. In April, the dissident group moved away from Congress and voted along People's Front (i.e. the opposition party). Kamisetty Parasuram got elected with support of all the 26 members of the Congress party.

1958 crisis
In another instance, the rivalry between two congress factions peaked in August 1958 and this time it was much severe. The former faction is headed by E. Goubert, the leader of the house and Rangaswami Pillai, leader of the dissident group. The dissidents had a strength of 10 members.  This rift got deepened when the dissidents joined the Communist-backed People's Front to elect the Assembly's office bearers (i.e. ministers).
Then president of INC, U. N. Dhebar tried to broker peace between the two rival groups in Delhi on 31 August 1958. The main bone of contention between the two factions was over the formation of Council of six ministers. The Congress president had suggested  Rangaswami and another dissident in his group, Arul Raj that the disciplinary action taken against them shall be withdrawn, provided some compromise is brought between the two faction to bring back unity. Then chief minister of Madras, K. Kamaraj was suggested to intervene to sort out this issue. But the deadlock remained leading to the intervention of the commissioner.

Early Dissolution
The government led by Congress was not stable as the ruling party was ridden with personal strifes and factions. Finally, the Government of India had to intervene finally by dissolving the Assembly following the instability caused by the change of party affiliation of members. Then, the Chief Commissioner took over the administration in October 1958. Later, after nine months, second general elections were held to the Pondicherry Representative Assembly in 1959.

See also 
Government of Puducherry
List of Chief Ministers of Puducherry
List of lieutenant governors of Puducherry
Puducherry Legislative Assembly
Pondicherry Representative Assembly
1955 Pondicherry Representative Assembly election
1959 Pondicherry Representative Assembly election

References

Notes

Puducherry Legislative Assembly
1955 establishments in India
1958 disestablishments in India